Dreimal sieben Gedichte aus Albert Girauds "Pierrot lunaire" ("Three times Seven Poems from Albert Giraud's 'Pierrot lunaire), commonly known simply as Pierrot lunaire, Op. 21 ("Moonstruck Pierrot" or "Pierrot in the Moonlight"), is a melodrama by Arnold Schoenberg. It is a setting of 21 selected poems from Albert Giraud's cycle of the same name as translated into German by Otto Erich Hartleben.
The work is written for reciter (voice-type unspecified in the score, but traditionally performed by a soprano) who delivers the poems in the Sprechstimme style accompanied by a small instrumental ensemble. Schoenberg had previously used a combination of spoken text with instrumental accompaniment, called "melodrama", in the summer-wind narrative of the Gurre-Lieder, which was a fashionable musical style popular at the end of the nineteenth century. Though the music is atonal, it does not employ Schoenberg's twelve-tone technique, which he did not use until 1921.

Pierrot lunaire is among Schoenberg's most celebrated and frequently performed works. Its instrumentation – flute, clarinet, violin, cello, and piano with standard doublings and in this case with the addition of a vocalist – is an important ensemble in 20th- and 21st-century classical music and is referred to as a Pierrot ensemble.

The piece was premiered at the Berlin Choralion-Saal on October 16, 1912, with Albertine Zehme as the vocalist. A typical performance lasts about 35 to 40 minutes. The American premiere took place at the Klaw Theatre, on Broadway, New York, on 4 February 1923 as part of a series of concerts organised by the International Composers' Guild.

History 
The work originated in a commission by Albertine Zehme, a former actress, for a cycle for voice and piano, setting a series of poems by the Belgian writer Albert Giraud. The verses had been first published in 1884 and later translated into German by Otto Erich Hartleben. Zehme had previously performed a 'melodrama' by composer Otto Vrieslander based on the translated poems. But, according to Eduard Steuermann, student of Schoenberg and pianist of the premiere, "the music was not strong enough, and someone advised her to approach Schoenberg."

Schoenberg began work on March 12 and completed the piece on July 9, 1912, having expanded the forces to an ensemble consisting of flute (doubling on piccolo), clarinet in A (doubling on bass clarinet and clarinet in B), violin (doubling on viola), cello, and piano.

After forty rehearsals, Schoenberg and Zehme (in Columbine dress) gave the premiere at the Berlin Choralion-Saal on October 16, 1912. Reaction was mixed. According to Anton Webern, some in the audience were whistling and laughing, but in the end "it was an unqualified success".  According to eyewitness Salka Viertel, the sister of the premiere's pianist Eduard Steuermann, 

There was some criticism of blasphemy in the texts, to which Schoenberg responded, "If they were musical, not a single one would give a damn about the words. Instead, they would go away whistling the tunes."

Structure
Pierrot lunaire consists of three groups of seven poems. In the first group, Pierrot sings of love, sex and religion; in the second, of violence, crime, and blasphemy; and in the third of his return home to Bergamo, with his past haunting him.

{| width="100%"
|- valign="top"
| width="33%" |

 Part One

 Mondestrunken (Drunk with Moonlight)
 Colombine (Columbine)
 Der Dandy (The Dandy)
 Eine blasse Wäscherin (A Pallid Washerwoman)
 Valse de Chopin
 Madonna
 Der kranke Mond (The Sick Moon)

| width="33%" |

 Part Two

 Nacht (Passacaglia) (Night)
 Gebet an Pierrot (Prayer to Pierrot)
 Raub (Theft)
 Rote Messe (Red Mass)
 Galgenlied (Gallows Song)
 Enthauptung (Beheading)
 Die Kreuze (The Crosses)

| width="33%" |

 Part Three

 Heimweh (Homesickness)
 Gemeinheit! (Foul Play)
 Parodie (Parody)
 Der Mondfleck (The Moon Spot)
 Serenade
 Heimfahrt (Barcarole) (Journey Home)
 O Alter Duft (O Ancient Fragrance)
|}

Schoenberg, who was fascinated by numerology, also makes great use of seven-note motifs throughout the work, while the ensemble (with conductor) comprises seven people. The piece is his opus 21, contains 21 poems, and was begun on March 12, 1912. Other key numbers in the work are 3 and 13: each poem consists of 13 lines (two four-line verses followed by a five-line verse), while the first line of each poem occurs three times (being repeated as lines 7 and 13).

Music and text 
Though written in a freely atonal style, Pierrot lunaire uses a variety of classical forms and techniques, including canon, fugue, rondo, passacaglia, and free counterpoint.

The instrumental combinations (including doublings) vary between most movements. The entire ensemble is used only in Nos. 6, 11, 14, 15 (end), 16, 18, 19 (end), 20, and 21. Musicologist Alan Lessem states about the work that "on the whole instrumental textures tend to become fuller as the work progresses" and that, in general, "the piano is the leading [instrumental] protagonist of the melodramas."

The poetry is a German version of a rondeau of the old French type with a double refrain. Each poem consists of three stanzas of 4 + 4 + 5 lines, with the first two lines of the first stanza (1,2) repeated as the last two lines of the second stanza (7,8), and line 1 additionally repeated (13) to close the third stanza and the poem. The first poem is shown below.

Sprechstimme / Sprechgesang 
The atonal, expressionistic settings of the text, with their echoes of German cabaret, bring the poems vividly to life. Sprechstimme is a style in which the vocalist uses the specified rhythms and pitches but does not sustain the pitches, allowing them to drop or rise, in the manner of speech. Schoenberg describes the technique in a foreword to the score:

In the score, Sprechstimme is indicated with small x's through the stems of notes. Though Sprechstimme is used throughout the piece, Schoenberg also occasionally indicates that certain passages are to be sung (gesungen).

Notable recordings

Notable recordings of this composition include:

Arnold Schoenberg himself made test recordings of the music with a group of Los Angeles musicians, nearly all European immigrants, from September 24 to 26, 1940. These recordings were eventually released on LP by Columbia Records in 1949, and reissued in 1974 on the Odyssey label.

The jazz singer Cleo Laine recorded Pierrot lunaire in 1974. Her version was nominated for a classical Grammy Award. Another jazz singer who has performed the piece is Sofia Jernberg, who sang it with Norrbotten NEO. 

The avant-pop star Björk, known for her interest in avant-garde music, performed Pierrot lunaire at the 1996 Verbier Festival with Kent Nagano conducting. According to the singer in a 2004 interview, "Kent Nagano wanted to make a recording of it, but I really felt that I would be invading the territory of people who sing this for a lifetime ." Only small recorded excerpts (possibly bootlegs) of her performance have become available.

The American mezzo-soprano Mary Nessinger has performed Pierrot lunaire extensively with organizations such as the Chamber Music Society of Lincoln Center, Chamber Music Northwest, and Sequitur at venues including Alice Tully Hall and Weill Recital Hall at Carnegie Hall.

In March 2011, Bruce LaBruce directed a performance at the Hebbel am Ufer Theatre in Berlin. This interpretation of the work included gender diversity, castration scenes and dildos, as well as a female to male transgender Pierrot. LaBruce subsequently filmed this adaptation as the 2014 theatrical film Pierrot lunaire.

Legacy as a standard ensemble

The quintet of instruments used in Pierrot lunaire became the core ensemble for The Fires of London, who formed in 1965 as "The Pierrot Players" to perform Pierrot lunaire, and continued to concertize with a varied classical and contemporary repertory. This group performed works arranged for these instruments and commissioned new works especially to take advantage of this ensemble's instrumental colors, up until it disbanded in 1987.

Over the years, other groups have continued to use this instrumentation professionally (current groups include Da Capo Chamber Players, eighth blackbird and the Finnish contemporary group Uusinta Lunaire) and have built a large repertoire for the ensemble.

Notes

References
Bryn-Julson, Phyllis, and Paul Mathews. 2009. Inside Pierrot lunaire: Performing the Sprechstimme in Schoenberg's Masterpiece. Lanham, Maryland: Scarecrow Press.  (pbk);  (ebook).
Byron, Avior. "The Test Pressings of Schoenberg Conducting Pierrot lunaire". accessed May 1, 2008.
Byron, Avior. 2006–07. "Pierrot lunaire in Studio and in Broadcast: Sprechstimme, Tempo and Character". Journal of the Society of Musicology in Ireland 2:69–91. (accessed October 29, 2008).
Dunsby, Jonathan. 1992. Schoenberg: Pierrot lunaire. Cambridge University Press. .

Hazlewood, Charles. 2006. Discovering Music. BBC Radio 3 (June 24).
Neighbour, Oliver W. 2001. "Schoenberg, Arnold (Franz Walter)". The New Grove Dictionary of Music and Musicians, second edition, edited by Stanley Sadie and John Tyrrell. London: Macmillan.
Puffett, Kathryn. 2006. "Structural Imagery: Pierrot lunaire Revisited". Tempo 60, no. 237 (July): 2–22.
Rosen, Charles. 1996. Arnold Schoenberg, with a new preface. Chicago: University of Chicago Press. .
Schoenberg, Arnold. 1994. Verklärte Nacht and Pierrot lunaire. Dover Publications. 
Winiarz, John. Schoenberg – Pierrot lunaire: an Atonal Landmark April 1, 2000 accessed July 23, 2006.

Further reading
Argentino, Joe. 2012. "Serialism and Neo-Riemannian Theory: Transformations and Hexatonic Cycles in Schoenberg's Modern Psalm Op. 50c". Intégral 26:123–58.
Gillespie, Jeffrey L. 1992. "Motivic Transformations and Networks in Schoenberg's 'Nacht' from Pierrot lunaire". Intégral 6:34–65.
Gingerich, Katrina (2012). "The Journey of the Song Cycle: From 'The Iliad' to 'American Idiot, Musical Offerings: Vol. 1: No. 2, Article 3.
Lambert, Philip. 2000. "On Contextual Transformations". Perspectives of New Music 38, no. 1 (Winter): 45–76.
Lessem, Alan. 1979. Music and Text in the Works of Arnold Schoenberg: The Critical Years, 1908–22. .
Metzer, David. 1994. "The New York Reception of Pierrot lunaire: The 1923 Premiere and Its Aftermath". The Musical Quarterly 78, no. 4 (Winter): 669–99.
Roig-Francolí, Miguel A. 2001. "A Theory of Pitch-Class-Set Extension in Atonal Music". College Music Symposium 41:57–90.
Weytjens, Stephan. 2004. “Text as a Crutch in Schoenberg's Pierrot Lunaire?”. Pierrot lunaire: Albert Giraud, Otto Erich Hartleben, Arnold Schoenberg: a collection of musicological and literary studies. Delaere, Mark, Jan Herman editors. Leuven, Belgium: Éditions Peeters: 109-24.

External links

 
 Manuscript of the score at the Arnold Schönberg center
 Luna Nova New Music Ensemble: Arnold Schoenberg's Pierrot lunaire, study guide featuring a complete performance
 Pierrot Lunaire Ensemble Wien, Austrian ensemble for contemporary music
 "Pierrot lunaire", LiederNet Archive

1912 compositions
Atonal compositions by Arnold Schoenberg
Compositions that use extended techniques
Compositions with a narrator